This is a list of finalists for the 2011 Archibald Prize for portraiture (listed is Artist – Title).

Abdul Abdullah – Waleed Aly
Giles Alexander – Space or bust (portrait of Sam Leach)
Del Kathryn Barton – Mother (a portrait of Cate)
Jason Benjamin – It's not all Henry bloody Lawson (portrait of musician Gareth Liddiard)
Kate Beynon – Painting shirt (self-portrait)
Natasha Bieniek – October (self-portrait)
Deidre But-Husaim – Roy Ananda (chin support)
Marcus Callum – Portrait of a seated woman (portrait of Vanessa Callum)
Adam Chang – John Coetzee (Winner of the 2011 People's Choice Award)
Zhong Chen – Self-portrait on a horse
Adam Cullen – Charlie (portrait of barrister Charles Waterstreet)
Lucy Culliton – Ray in Paris (portrait of art dealer Ray Hughes)
Susanne de Berenger – Ted Robinson
Ken Done – Me, March 2011 (self-portrait)
Matt Doust – White Cocoon (portrait of actress Gemma Ward)
Geoffrey Dyer – The collector, David Walsh
Vincent Fantauzzo – Matt Moran (Winner of the 2011 Packing Room Prize)
Nicholas Harding – Hugo at home (portrait of actor Hugo Weaving)
Jeremy Kibel – Portrait of Robert Jacks AO
Sonia Kretschmar – The heart of things (portrait of Cassandra Golds)
Michael Lindeman – Portrait of Wilfred (portrait of actor Jason Gann)
Song Ling – My name is Fartunate – self-portrait
Fiona Lowry – Portrait of Tim Silver
Tom Macbeth – Jessica (portrait of sailor Jessica Watson)
Amanda Marburg – DA (portrait of writer David Astle)
Angus McDonald – Dr Ann Lewis AO
Alexander McKenzie – Richard Roxburgh
Christopher McVinish – Portrait of Robyn Nevin
Andrew Mezei – Professor Penny Sackett, astronomer and physicist
Lewis Miller – Small self-portrait
Rodney Pople – Artist and family (after Caravaggio) (portrait of artist, his wife Felicity Fenner and their two sons)
Ben Quilty – Margaret Olley (Winner of the Archibald Prize)
Craig Ruddy – Cathy Freeman
Jenny Sages – My Jack (portrait of artist's husband, Jack Sages)
Jiawei Shen – Self-portrait as Quong Tart's contemporary (after John Thomson), 2010
Xenia Stefanescu – Woven in tapestry of life (self-portrait)
Tim Storrier – Moon boy (self-portrait as a young man)
Pam Tippett – Self-portrait (for a change)
Barbara Tyson – The country's woman: Her Excellency, Ms Quentin Bryce AC, Governor-General of Australia
Peter Wegner – Richard Morecroft
Apple Xiu Yin – Hearing • Meditation (portrait of operatic soprano Cheryl Barker)

See also 
Previous year: List of Archibald Prize 2010 finalists
Next year: List of Archibald Prize 2012 finalists
List of Archibald Prize winners

External links
Archibald Prize 2011 finalists, official website, Art Gallery of NSW

2011
Archibald
Archibald Prize 2011
Archibald Prize 2011
Arch
Archibald